Kaynar is a village in Talas Region of Kyrgyzstan. It is part of the Kara-Buura District. Its population was 1,570 in 2021.

References

Populated places in Talas Region